The Roman Catholic Diocese of Obala is a diocese located in the city of Obala in the Ecclesiastical province of Yaoundé in Cameroon.

History
 3 July 1987: Established as Diocese of Obala from the Metropolitan Archdiocese of Yaoundé.

Bishops
 Bishops of Obala (Latin Rite), in reverse chronological order
 Bishop Sosthène Léopold Bayemi Matjei (since 3 December 2009)
 Bishop Jérôme Owono-Mimboe (3 July 1987 − 3 December 2009)

Other priests of this diocese who became bishops
Dieudonné Espoir Atangana, appointed Bishop of Nkongsamba in 2012
Damase Zinga Atangana, appointed Bishop of Kribi in 2015

See also
Roman Catholicism in Cameroon

References

External links
 GCatholic.org

Roman Catholic dioceses in Cameroon
Christian organizations established in 1987
Roman Catholic dioceses and prelatures established in the 20th century
Roman Catholic Ecclesiastical Province of Yaoundé